Rentian may refer to the following locations in China:

 Rentian, Fujian (稔田镇), town in Shanghang County
 Rentian, Jiangxi (壬田镇), town in Ruijin